Restoration is a 2016 Australian made-for-TV science fiction thriller film directed by Stuart Willis. It premiered in Australia on 6 August 2016 on 9Go! and screened on Stan from November 2016. It was released in September 2019 as a DUSTx Original Series. Producers are now developing the concept into a long-form series.

In 2019, Restoration was ranked #11 in Web Series World Cup's "All Time" Rankings for most awarded and acclaimed web series since 2015 and was crowned the overall Sci-Fi Champion. It was ranked #11 in the Web Series World Cup in 2018, and #19 in 2017.

Premise
In a near-future world, where individuals have their memories downloaded for backup, a man awakes in a body that is not his own.

Cast
 Grant Cartwright as Oliver Klein
 Stephen Carracher as Gavin Worth
Craig McLachlan as Andrew Majury
 Nadia Townsend as Emma Laws
 Rosie Lourde as Talia Klein
 Ailís Logan as Dr Francis Parr

Accolades

References

External links 
Official Website
 
 

2016 films
English-language television shows
Australian science fiction thriller films
2010s English-language films
2010s Australian films